Arrens-Marsous is a commune in the Hautes-Pyrénées department in southwestern France.

In the village, the Maison du Val d'Azun is an information centre and small museum of the area.

Geography

Climate

Arrens-Marsous has a oceanic climate (Köppen climate classification Cfb).

Population

See also
 GR 10 footpath
Communes of the Hautes-Pyrénées department

References

Communes of Hautes-Pyrénées